Oswald Dome (elevation ), also known as Bean Mountain, is a mountain located in the Cherokee National Forest in Polk County, Tennessee. It is part of the Blue Ridge Mountains, which is part of the larger Appalachian Mountains.

Description 
Oswald Dome is located on the western fringe of the Blue Ridge province of the Appalachian Mountains, and is sometimes considered part of the Unicoi Mountains, a subrange of the Blue Ridge Mountains. The Hiwassee River flows along the north base, and a saddle separates the mountain from Chilhowee Mountain to the south, although both mountains are technically part of the same ridge. The Ridge-and Valley province is directly below the mountain to the west. The mountain is accessible by Oswald Dome Road, a forest service road which connects to U.S. 64, and two trails. The Lowry Cove Trail begins on top of the mountain and heads north. Several radio/television transmitters are located atop the mountain. A fire tower was moved from the mountain to the Ocoee Whitewater Center in 2004.

Towers 
WPDP-CD (Cleveland)
WWRO (Benton)
WCPH (Etowah)
WMCC-LP (Etowah)

References 

Cherokee National Forest
Protected areas of Polk County, Tennessee
Mountains of Tennessee
Landforms of Polk County, Tennessee